Diego Giuglar (born 1983) is an Italian male lifesaving athlete who won a gold medal with the national team at the 2009 World Games.

Giuglar is an athlete of the Gruppo Sportivo della Marina Militare.

Biography

See also
List of 2009 World Games medal winners

References

External links
 Diego Giuglar at Lifesaving Rankings
 Diego Giuglar at G.S. Marina Militare

1983 births
Living people
Lifesaving athletes of Marina Militare
Italian male lifesaving athletes